Ghetto Stories may refer to:

 Ghetto Stories (Lil Boosie and Webbie album), 2003
 Swizz Beatz Presents G.H.E.T.T.O. Stories, a 2002 album by Swizz Beatz
 Ghetto Stories (film), a 2010 American crime film